Suadero, in Mexican cuisine, is a thin cut of meat from the intermediate part of the cow or pork between the belly and the leg. Suadero is noted for having a smooth texture rather than a muscle grain. Typically, suadero is confited or fried and used as a taco filling.

Suadero, also known as matambre in Argentina and sobrebarriga in Colombia, is the name of a very thin cut of beef in Argentina, Paraguay and Uruguay, taken from between the skin and the ribs, a sort of flank steak. In Mexico   City, México; it is very common and popular, offered  mainly on street taco stands; but also eaten in sandwiches (tortas) and in a sort of round thick hollow fritters, made of corn dough; served hot, flat and filled with various meats, garnishes and sauces; called gorditas.

References

Further reading
Aeberhard, Danny, Andrew Benson, and Lucy Philips. The Rough Guide to Argentina, Second Edition. New York: The Penguin Group, 2005.
Global Gourmet: Argentina. 2006. 24 January 2006

Mexican cuisine
Mexican beef dishes